is an arcade game that was released by Namco on September 20, 1985. It runs on Namco Super Pac-Man hardware but with a video system like that used in Mappy, The Tower of Druaga, Grobda (without the DAC) and Dig Dug II.

Gameplay

The player must take control of the eponymous Motos, a bumper car whose goal is to force enemies over the edge of the playfield by bumping up against them; however, all the enemies are capable of doing exactly the same thing to it. "Power parts" and "jump parts" can also be collected during the 62 rounds, which will give Motos extra bumping power and the ability to jump over gaps in the playfield.

Ports
The game was ported to the Commodore 64, Amstrad CPC, and ZX Spectrum, and was also released in 1998 as part of Microsoft Revenge of Arcade for Windows PCs - the first known appearance of the arcade version in North America. More recently, the game was released in 2005 as part of Namco Museum Battle Collection for the PlayStation Portable, as well as Namco Museum Virtual Arcade for the Xbox 360 on November 4, 2008. The game is also present in two Namco Museum compilations that were originally released exclusively in Japan: Namco Museum Encore for the PlayStation, in 1997, and Namco Museum Volume 2 for the PlayStation Portable, in 2006. The latter also features an updated "Arrangement" version of the game (made in the spirit of the 6 original "Arrangements") with 3D graphics.

A "remixed" version of the game featuring Namco's signature character, Pac-Man, was released as part of Namco Museum Remix under the name of Pac-Motos - and Namco Museum Megamix also included the original game along with the remix.

Reception 
In Japan, Game Machine listed Motos on their October 15, 1985 issue as being the fifth most-successful table arcade unit of the month.

References

External links
 
 Motos at the Arcade History database

1985 video games
Action video games
Amstrad CPC games
Arcade video games
Commodore 64 games
Namco arcade games
Nintendo Switch games
PlayStation 4 games
Mastertronic games
X68000 games
Multiplayer and single-player video games
Video games developed in Japan
ZX Spectrum games
Hamster Corporation games